The Oklahoma Sooners baseball program is a college baseball team that represents the University of Oklahoma. The team has had eleven head coaches since organized baseball began 1898. The current head coach is Skip Johnson who was hired in 2018.

In those seasons, five coaches have won conference championships with the Sooners: Bill Owen, Lawrence Haskell, Jack Baer, Enos Semore and Larry Cochell. Two coaches have won national championships: Baer and Cochell. Semore is the all-time leader in games coached, years coached and wins. Owen is the overall leader in winning percentage. Baer has the lowest winning percentage.

Key

Coaches

Notes

References
General

Lists of college baseball head coaches in the United States

Oklahoma Sooners baseball coaches